A bakestone is a type of griddle, particularly associated with Wales, where they are used for cooking Welsh cakes.

In Lancashire and the West Riding of Yorkshire the spelling is bakstone and are primarily used to cook very thin, yeasted oatcakes or riddle bread.

New bakestones are seasoned by burning a mixture of lard or oil and salt, giving a non-stick surface and protecting against rust. The blackened surface is not removed when the bakestone is cleaned and bakestones are believed to improve with repeated use.

References

Baking